Grape leaves, the leaves of the grapevine plant, are used in the cuisines of a number of cultures. They may be obtained fresh, or preserved in jars or cans. The leaves are commonly rolled or stuffed with mixtures of meat and rice to produce dolma (often, sarma), found widely in the Mediterranean, Balkans, and Middle East. They may also be used in various other recipes and dishes.  When cut into smaller pieces they are used as a savory addition to soups that include greens and cabbage.

Nutrition
Canned grape leaves (cooked, salted) are 76% water, 12% carbohydrates, 4% protein, and 2% fat.

Gallery

See also

 Grape seed
 List of grape dishes

References

Grape dishes
Leaves
Middle Eastern cuisine
Mediterranean cuisine
Stuffed vegetable dishes